Gira Del Adiós (Turnê Do Adeus in Brazil) is the fourth world tour by Mexican group RBD. The tour visited South America, North America and Europe starting on November 1 and ending December 21.

Production
Following the announcement of their separation, RBD said that they planned a last tour to say goodbye.
The tour included about 20 shows in countries such as Argentina, Venezuela, Ecuador, Paraguay, Chile, and Brazil.

In the month of November 2008, the group began the tour in the following cities: La Paz (Bolivia), Buenos Aires, Cordoba and Rosario (Argentina), Fortaleza, Porto Alegre, Rio de Janeiro, São Paulo and Brasília (Brazil).

In December, shows by RBD were presented in the cities of Los Angeles (United States), then back to Brazil for two extra concerts in São Paulo and Rio de Janeiro; Guayaquil, Quito (Ecuador ), Lima (Peru), Santiago (Chile), Ljubljana (Slovenia), Belgrade (Serbia), and Madrid Spain.

Notes
The singer Pee Wee only opened the concerts of the group in Brazil (except the extra two shows).
The group came back again to Brazil to do two extra shows in the country. Maite Perroni was absent in some shows due to her work in Cuidado Con El Ángel.

Broadcasts and recordings 
 Tournée do Adeus

The special O Adeus was broadcast by television network Rede Record (Brazil). The group officially disbanded on March 10, 2009 with the launch of its latest studio album of (Para Olvidarte De Mí), but with one last special, "O Adeus" ("The Goodbye"), the "Turnê Do Adeus" (Gira Del Adiós or Tour Del Adiós).

Setlist
"Cariño Mío"
"Aún Hay Algo"
"Celestial"
"Un Poco de tu Amor"
"Otro Día que Va"
"Ser o Parecer"
"Hoy Que Te Vas"
"Solo Quédate en Silencio"
"Inalcanzable"
"Y No Puedo Olvidarte"
"Light up The World Tonight"
"Sálvame"
"Este Corazón"
"Tu Amor"
"No Pares"
"Empezar Desde Cero"
"Solo Para Ti"
"Me Voy"
"Qué Hay Detrás"
"Bésame Sin Miedo"
"Nuestro Amor"
"Tras de Mí"
"Rebelde"

Dates

Awards

References

2008 concert tours
RBD concert tours